England comprises most of the central and southern two-thirds of the island of Great Britain, in addition to a number of small islands of which the largest is the Isle of Wight. England is bordered to the north by Scotland and to the west by Wales. It is closer to continental Europe than any other part of mainland Britain, divided from France only by a  sea gap, the English Channel. The  Channel Tunnel, near Folkestone, directly links England to mainland Europe. The English/French border is halfway along the tunnel.

Most of England consists of low hills and plains, with upland and mountainous terrain in the north and west. Uplands in the north include the Pennines, an upland chain dividing east and west, the Lake District, containing the highest mountains in the country, the Cheviot Hills across the Anglo-Scottish border, and the North York Moors near the North Sea. Uplands in the west include Dartmoor and Exmoor in the south west and the Shropshire Hills near Wales. The approximate dividing line between terrain types is often indicated by the Tees–Exe line. To the south of that line, there are larger areas of flatter land, including East Anglia and the Fens, although hilly areas include the Cotswolds, the Chilterns, and the North and South Downs.

The largest natural harbour in England is at Poole, on the south-central coast. Some regard it as the second largest harbour in the world, after Sydney, Australia, although this fact is disputed (see harbours for a list of other large natural harbours).

Climate

England has a temperate climate, with plentiful rainfall all year round, it has a more mild climate than places at similar latitudes, for example Newfoundland in Canada, or Sakhalin in Russia. The seasons are quite variable in temperature, however temperatures rarely fall below −5 °C (23 °F) or rise above 30 °C (86 °F). The prevailing wind is from the south-west, bringing mild and wet weather to England regularly from the Atlantic Ocean. It is driest in the east and warmest in the south, which is closest to the European mainland. Snowfall can occur in winter and early spring, although it is not very common away from high ground.
England has warmer maximum and minimum temperatures throughout the year than the other countries of the UK, though Wales has milder minima from November to February, and Northern Ireland has warmer maxima from December to February. England is also sunnier throughout the year, but unlike Wales, Northern Ireland and Scotland, the sunniest month is July, totalling around 192.8 hours.
 
The highest temperature recorded in England is 38.7 °C (101.7 °F) on 25 July 2019 at Cambridge University Botanic Garden. The lowest temperature recorded in England is −26.1 °C (−15.0 °F) on 10 January 1982 at Edgmond, near Shropshire.
The climate of south-west England is rather distinct and somewhat milder than the rest of England, forming its own separate climate. Crops, flowers and plants can be grown much earlier in the south-west than in the rest of England and the UK.

England mainly lies within hardiness zone 8, but the Pennines and Cumbrian Mountains lie in the colder zone 7 and south west England, the Irish sea coast, South coast and London lie in the warmer zone 9. A very small area, the Isles of Scilly lie in the warmest zone in the British Isles, zone 10 which is close to Sub-Tropical.

Geology

The Geology of England is mainly sedimentary. The youngest rocks are in the south east, progressing in age in a north-westerly direction. The Tees–Exe line marks the division between younger, softer and low-lying rocks in the south east and older, harder, and generally a higher relief in the north-west. 
The geology of England is recognisable in the landscape of its counties, for instance Cumbria, Kent and Norfolk all have very distinct and very different looks from each other.
The geology of Northern England and Western England tends to be somewhat closer to that of its near neighbours, Wales and Scotland, with the geology of Southern England and Eastern England being more aligned with that found across the North Sea and English Channel in Northern France, Belgium, and the Netherlands.

Geological features:
Cheddar Gorge – the largest gorge in Great Britain
Jurassic Coast – a UNESCO World Heritage Site
Salisbury Plain
Tees–Exe line
Whin Sill
London Basin
Hampshire Basin
London-Brabant Massif
Dartmoor – one of a series of moors in the South West of England developing tors on a granitic batholith
Lizard Complex – an ancient piece of oceanic crust, onshore (i.e. an Ophiolite).

Geological resources:
Coal
North Sea oil
Sand and Gravel
China Clay
Copper and Tin
Stone
North Sea gas
Potash

and less abundantly,

Geothermal energy
Onshore oil

Major towns and cities

London is, by far, the largest urban area in England and one of the largest and busiest cities in the world. Other cities, mainly in central and northern England, are of substantial size and influence. The list of England's largest cities or urban areas is open to debate because, although the normal meaning of city is "a continuously built-up urban area", this can be hard to define, particularly because administrative areas in England often do not correspond with the limits of urban development, and many towns and cities have, over the centuries, grown to form complex urban agglomerations. For the official definition of a UK (and therefore English) city, see City status in the United Kingdom.

According to the ONS urban area populations for continuous built-up areas, these are the 15 largest conurbations (population figures from the 2001 census):

The largest cities in England are as follows (in alphabetical order):

 Birmingham
 Bradford
 Bristol
 Coventry
 Derby
 Kingston upon Hull
 Leeds
 Leicester
 Liverpool
 London
 Manchester
 Newcastle upon Tyne
 Norwich
 Nottingham
 Oxford
 Peterborough
 Plymouth
 Portsmouth
 Sheffield
 Southampton
 Stoke-on-Trent
 Wolverhampton
 York

Physical geography

Extreme points

The extreme points of England are:

England (mainland)

Northernmost point – Marshall Meadows Bay, Northumberland at 
Northernmost settlement – Marshall Meadows, Northumberland at 
Southernmost point – Lizard Point, Cornwall at 
Southernmost settlement – Lizard, Cornwall at 
Westernmost point – Land's End, Cornwall at 
Westernmost settlement – Sennen Cove, Cornwall at 
Easternmost point – Lowestoft Ness, Suffolk at 
Easternmost settlement – Lowestoft, Suffolk at

England (including islands)

Northernmost point – Marshall Meadows Bay, Northumberland at 
Northernmost settlement – Marshall Meadows, Northumberland at 
Southernmost point – Western Rocks, Isles of Scilly at 
Southernmost settlement – St Agnes, Isles of Scilly at 
Westernmost point – Crim Rocks, Isles of Scilly at 
Westernmost settlement – St Agnes, Isles of Scilly at 
Easternmost point – Lowestoft Ness, Suffolk at 
Easternmost settlement – Lowestoft, Suffolk at

Topography, mountains and hills

England is generally lower and flatter than the rest of the UK, but has two main divisions in its form – the lowland areas of the south, east, and midlands and the more rugged and upland areas of the north and west.
East Anglia is the lowest area of England, having no high hills or mountains and hosting an area of the Fens, the lowest area of England. The highest area of England is the North West, which contains England's highest hills and mountains, including its highest – Scafell Pike.

In England, a mountain is officially defined as land over 600 metres, so most fall in Northern England. Some hill and mountain chains in England are:

Lake District (Cumbrian Mountains) – the highest mountains in England, containing Scafell Pike.
Cheviot Hills – sometimes considered as an extension of either the Southern Uplands in Scotland or the Pennines.
Border Moors and Forests – uplands to the south of the Cheviot Hills.
The Pennines which characterise much of Northern England and are often dubbed "the backbone of England".
The Peak District –  uplands forming the southern end of the Pennines in central and northern England.
South Pennines - area of the southern Pennines between the Peak District, Forest of Bowland and Yorkshire Dales.
Forest of Bowland - a western spur of the Pennines in Lancashire.
Yorkshire Dales – an upland area of the northern Pennines.
North Pennines - uplands forming the northern end of the Pennines.
Howgill Fells - uplands in Cumbria between the Lake District and Yorkshire Dales.
Orton Fells - uplands in Cumbria between the Lake District and Eden Valley.
North York Moors – an area of hills and moorlands beside the North Sea.
Exmoor – uplands beside the Bristol Channel.
Dartmoor – an area of uplands in the heart of Devon.
The Cotswolds – a quintessentially and stereotypical English rural area.
Chilterns – a collection of low hills.
South Downs – low hills close to the English Channel which form the white cliffs of the English South Coast.
Shropshire Hills – uplands near Wales.

Cities
Cities with the highest urban elevation include Sheffield, Bradford, Stoke-on-Trent and Birmingham. Low-lying cities near sea level include London, Liverpool, Norwich and York.

Islands

The main English islands by area and population are:

English islands by population

Rivers

The longest river in England is the River Severn which has its source in Wales, enters England at its confluence with the River Vyrnwy and flows into the Bristol Channel. The longest river entirely within England is the River Thames which flows through the English and British capital, London. The Vale of York and The Fens host many of England's larger rivers.

Coastline

England has  of coastline, much less than the deeply indented Scottish coastline.
The English coastline varies a great deal by the seas and regions it borders. The North Sea coast of England is mainly flat and sandy with many dunes and is similar to coastlines across the sea in the Netherlands. 
The English North Sea coast is an important area of bird life and is a habitat for many shore and wading birds. Along the English Channel, the South Coast builds up into steep, white cliffs at Dover, which are often seen as an iconic symbol of England and Britain.

The South Coast continues to the Isle of Wight, but eventually gives way to the Jurassic Coast of Dorset, a coastline rich in beauty, history and fossils.

Into Devon and Cornwall, the coastline becomes more rocky and steep, with numerous cliffs and tiny fishing villages along the coastline. This stretch of coastline stretches from Devon to Land's End in Cornwall, the westernmost part of mainland England.
The coastline of Devon and Cornwall has similarities to that of Brittany in France directly opposite.

Following the coastline northwards the coast remains much the same as in south Devon and Cornwall but is besides the Celtic Sea until it eventually reaches the Bristol Channel, an important shipping and docking area.

The English coastline re-emerges again in North West England. The coastline here is similar to the North Sea coast in that it is mainly flat and sandy, with the only notable cliffs along this stretch of coast being at St Bees Head in Cumbria. The English Irish Sea coast is an important area of estuaries and bird life, with Wirral being a peninsula bounded by two rivers, the River Dee and the River Mersey. Liverpool and Merseyside are areas of high population and important industry along this coast, with tourist resorts of Southport and Blackpool being further to the north.
The English Irish Sea coast hosts two important geographic areas, Morecambe Bay, a large bay, and the Furness and Walney Island areas.
Further north into Cumbria the  Sellafield Nuclear Power Station lies along this coast. The English section of the Irish Sea coast ends at the border with Scotland in the Solway Firth.

Seas bordering England are:

North Sea
English Channel
Celtic Sea
Bristol Channel
Irish Sea

Largest lakes and reservoirs 

Although the largest nation within the UK, England is relatively absent of large lakes, with many of its former wetlands being drained throughout the Middle Ages. Most of its largest lakes lie within the aptly named Lake District in Cumbria, Northern England.

Human geography

Land use

Crops and fallow land accounts for 30% of the land area, grasses and rough grazing 36%, other agricultural land 5%, forest and woodland 8%, and urban development 21%.

Neighbouring countries
England has two land borders: a  border with Scotland that follows the Cheviot Hills and a  border with Wales that loosely follows the route of Offa's Dyke. 
To the west, the Irish Sea separates England from Ireland and the Isle of Man; to the east, the North Sea separates England from Denmark, Germany, the Netherlands and Belgium and to the south, the English Channel separates England from France and the Channel Islands.

Economic geography

England boasts one of the largest economies in Europe and indeed the world, with an average GDP per capita of £22,907.
England's economy is usually regarded as a mixed market economy, it has adopted many free market principles in contrast to the Rhine Capitalism of Europe, yet maintains an advanced social welfare infrastructure. 
The currency in England is the pound sterling, also known as the GBP. England prints its own banknotes which are also circulated in Wales.
The economy of England is the largest part of the United Kingdom's economy.

Regional differences:

The strength of the English economy varies from region to region. GDP, and GDP per capita is highest in London. Generally the Northern and Western areas of England are the poorest, with the Southern and Eastern areas being the richest.
The following table shows the GDP (2004) per capita of England as a whole and each of the nine regions.

Two of the 10 economically strongest areas in the European Union are in England. Inner London is number 1 with a €71 338 GDP per capita (303% above EU average);Berkshire, Buckinghamshire & Oxfordshire is number 7 with a €40 937 GDP per capita (174% above EU average).

Political geography
England, formerly a kingdom and independent country, united with Scotland to form what would eventually become the UK (Wales was treated as part of England at that time).

England is in a unique and controversial position of being a political entity within the UK and as of 2015 having no self-governance. England is represented by MPs in the British Parliament and matters relating only to England are also dealt with by the UK parliament. England was divided into a number of regions which also sent representatives to the European Parliament before Brexit.

See also

North-South divide in England
Geography of the United Kingdom
Geography of Scotland
Geography of Wales
Geology of England
Climate of England
List of islands of England
List of rivers of England
List of lakes of England
Economy of England
Lake District
Pennines
Northern England
Southern England
North Sea

References

 

pt:Inglaterra#Geografia